Saima Akram Chaudhry is a Pakistani screenwriter. She is known for her work in Pakistani television serials.

Early life 
Chaudhry was born in the Rahim Yar Khan District, Sadiqabad Tehsil, Punjab Pakistan. She earned her M.A in Mass Communication from the Bahauddin Zakariya University.

Career

Chaudhry's first serial was Muhabbat Ab Nahi Hugi for HUM TV in 2014. She wrote Anaya Tumhari Hui in 2015 for Geo Entertainment.

Later, she wrote many scripts, including Mere Ajnabi for ARY Digital in 2015, Mera Dard Na Janay Koi in 2015 for Hum TV, Adhi Gawahi for Hum TV in 2017, Gustakh for Express Entertainment in 2020, and Choti Choti Batain in 2019.

She wrote television films such as Love Siyapa and Dil Tera Hogaya in 2020 for Geo TV. Her romantic comedy serial Suno Chanda earned her critical acclaim. She also wrote the sequel to Suno Chanda, Suno Chanda season 2.

In 2021, she wrote two Ramadan plays Ishq Jalebi and Chupke Chupke. In 2022, she followed that with two more Ramadan plays Hum Tum and Chaudhry and Sons.

Works

References

External links 

Living people
Punjabi people
Pakistani television writers
Pakistani women novelists
Women television writers
21st-century Pakistani women writers
Islamia University of Bahawalpur alumni
21st-century screenwriters
1985 births